Oleksandr Oleksandrovych Petrusenko (born 26 March 1998) is a Ukrainian professional footballer who plays as a defensive midfielder for Croatian club Istra 1961.

Career
Born in Kyiv, Petrusenko is a product of the local Youth Sportive School #15. His first trainers were Volodymyr Ralchenko and Ruslan Kanavskyi.

He played for FC Dynamo in the Ukrainian Premier League Reserves and was released in September 2019. In January 2021, Petrusenko signed contract with FC Mynai in the Ukrainian Premier League. He made his debut in the Ukrainian Premier League for Mynai on 13 February 2021, playing as the start squad player in a losing home match against FC Lviv.

References

External links 
 
 

1998 births
Living people
Footballers from Kyiv
Ukrainian footballers
Ukraine youth international footballers
Ukraine under-21 international footballers
Association football midfielders
FC Dynamo Kyiv players
FC Hirnyk-Sport Horishni Plavni players
FC Mynai players
Budapest Honvéd FC players
NK Istra 1961 players
Ukrainian Premier League players
Ukrainian First League players
Nemzeti Bajnokság I players
Croatian Football League players
Ukrainian expatriate footballers
Expatriate footballers in Hungary
Ukrainian expatriate sportspeople in Hungary
Expatriate footballers in Croatia
Ukrainian expatriate sportspeople in Croatia